Coreoidea is a superfamily of true bugs in the infraorder Pentatomomorpha which includes leaf-footed bugs and allies. There are more than 3,300 described species in Coreoidea.

There are five extant families presently recognized, but the Coreoidea as a whole are part of a close-knit group with the Lygaeoidea and Pyrrhocoroidea and it is likely that these three superfamilies are paraphyletic to a significant extent; they are therefore in need of revision and redelimitation.

The families are: 
 Alydidae Amyot & Serville, 1843 – broad-headed bugs
 Coreidae Leach, 1815 – leaf-footed bugs and squash bugs
 Hyocephalidae Bergroth, 1906
 Rhopalidae  – scentless plant bugs
 Stenocephalidae Amyot & Serville, 1843
 † Trisegmentatidae Zhang, Sun & Zhang, 1994
 † Yuripopovinidae Azar, Nel, Engel, Garrouste & Matocq, 2011
 † Pachymeridiidae Handlirsch, 1906

References

External links

 
 
  (1995): Pentatomomorpha. Flat bugs, stink bugs, seed bugs, leaf-footed bugs, scentless plant bugs, etc.. Version of 1995-JAN-01. Retrieved 2008-JUL-28.
  (2005): Coreoidea. Broad-headed bugs, leaf-footed bugs, scentless plant bugs, etc.. Version of 2005-JUN-21. Retrieved 2008-JUL-28.

 
Hemiptera superfamilies